The Fiat 2300 is a six-cylinder executive car which was produced by Italian automotive manufacturer Fiat between 1961 and 1969. The 2300 was made as saloon (styled by Dante Giacosa), estate car and coupé. The 2300 saloon is noteworthy as in 1966 it became the first Fiat model to be available with an automatic transmission.

2300 Coupé
Alongside saloon and estate models the 2300 range included Ghia-designed grand tourers, the Fiat 2300 Coupé and 2300S Coupé—the latter fitted with a more powerful engine with double twin-choke carburettors. The shape of the car was first seen in public when Ghia presented it as a prototype sports coupé at the 1960 Turin Motor Show. A production version, based on the newly launched Fiat 2300 saloon was presented in 1961 and went on general sale in 1962. Having developed the coupé body, Ghia lacked the production capacity needed for the volumes envisaged, and were obliged to subcontract its production to OSI.

The coupé body was welded to the standard floor platform of the 2300 saloon with which it shared its core components. (Despite being a new model, the 2300 saloon was in most respects a well-proven design, being a larger engined version of the Fiat 2100 that had been available since 1959.) The wheelbase was identical, but the coupé had a slightly wider track at both ends than the saloon, and final drive gearing for the coupé was increased to 3.9 (3.72 for the 2300S coupé) which translated to 20.9 mph (33.6 km/h) per 1,000 rpm.
Inside the 2300 Coupé featured power operated windows and other luxury fittings.

Specifications
The Fiat 2300 used unibody construction. Front suspension was by double wishbones, sprung by torsion bars, with hydraulic dampers and an anti-roll bar; at the rear there was a solid axle with leaf springs, hydraulic dampers and an anti-roll bar.
The brakes were servo-assisted discs on all four corners.
On most 2300s and all 2300S coupés the transmission was an all-synchromesh 4-speed manual, with optional overdrive. A Saxomat automated clutch was available as optional extra; from 1966 a Borg Warner 3-speed automatic was offered in its place.

The overhead valve straight-six engine had a cast iron block and an aluminium cylinder head. While the 2300 engine was fitted with a single twin-choke downdraught carburettor, the more powerful 2300S used two twin-choke horizontal carburettors.

References

Further reading
Fiat Personenwagen, by Fred Steiningen, 1994. 

2300
Cars introduced in 1961
Flagship vehicles
Rear-wheel-drive vehicles
Sedans
Station wagons
Coupés